Coelocnemis is a genus of darkling beetles in the family Tenebrionidae. There are about seven described species in Coelocnemis, found mainly in western Canada, western United States, and Mexico.

Species
These species belong to the genus Coelocnemis:
 Coelocnemis dilaticollis Mannerheim, 1843 (California broad-necked darkling beetle)
 Coelocnemis lucia Doyen, 1973
 Coelocnemis magna LeConte, 1851
 Coelocnemis punctata LeConte, 1855
 Coelocnemis rugulosa Doyen, 1973
 Coelocnemis slevini Blaisdell, 1925
 Coelocnemis sulcata Casey, 1895

References

External links

 

Tenebrionoidea